Torodora rectilinea is a moth in the family Lecithoceridae. It is found in Taiwan.

References

Moths described in 2003
Torodora